Khishniyah is a depopulated village near Al-Rafid in Quneitra Governorate, Syria.

Quneitra Governorate
Quneitra District